Samsung Galaxy S Duos also known as GT-S7562 is a dual SIM smartphone, designed and marketed by Samsung Electronics. In contrast with other dual sim Samsung models, this phone is a part of the high-end "S" series, this is why it is marketed as a part of the "''Galaxy S'' family.

The phone also comes with Android 4.0.4 Ice Cream Sandwich, along with Samsung's proprietary Touchwiz interface.

Unlike entry-level dual SIM models from Samsung, the Galaxy S Duos is active on both SIMs all the time so it is ready to receive calls on either SIM when a call is not already in progress. Optionally it can receive two calls simultaneously, but this requires divert-on-busy to be set up on each number and is subject to availability from the carrier and may incur additional charges. A limitation of the Galaxy S Duos is that only one SIM can be active on UMTS (and therefore data) at a time and so it may be unsuitable for certain combinations of networks.

Variants

China 
China Unicom offers the Galaxy S Duos as the GT-S7562i, which is essentially the same phone as the international version, and a variant called the GT-S7562C which omits the proximity sensor.

Features 

 HSDPA 7.2 (900/2100 MHz).
 Quad-band (850/900/1800/1900 MHz)
 Android 4.0.4 Ice Cream Sandwich.
 100.8mm (4.0") WVGA TFT LCD display.
 5MP AF with Flash + VGA.
 1 GHz One Processor
 Smart lock for safety.
 3.5mm jack headphones.
 TouchWiz for Android
 GPS/GEO-tagging

See also 
 Comparison of Samsung Galaxy S smartphones

References 

Android (operating system) devices
Samsung smartphones
I5500
I5500
Mobile phones introduced in 2012
Discontinued smartphones